František Roman Dragoun (1916–2005) was a Czech portrait painter from Písek. He painted more than five thousand paintings and drawings and was also a poet.  His son, Roman Dragoun, is a notable progressive rock musician.

See also
List of Czech painters

References

1916 births
2005 deaths
People from Písek
20th-century Czech painters
Czechoslovak painters
Czech male painters
20th-century Czech male artists